The  is an automobile which was manufactured by Toyota from December 1970 to December 2001. It was introduced as a sedan counterpart of the Celica, with which it originally shared a platform. Later, it was realigned to the Corona platform, but retained its performance image, with distinctive bodywork and interior — aimed at the youth market and remaining exclusive to Japanese Toyota dealerships Toyota Store. It was replaced in Japan by the Toyota Allion in 2001 and succeeded in Europe by the Toyota Avensis.

The inspiration for the name Carina came from the constellation Carina, sharing a naming inspiration with the Celica, which is ultimately derived from the Latin word coelica meaning "heavenly" or "celestial".

First generation (A10/A30; 1970–1977) 

The first-generation Carina was manufactured from December 1970, and sold at Toyota Store dealership channels in Japan, sharing its platform with the Toyota Celica sports coupe. Its European release took place in October 1971. Toyota was able to save development and tooling costs by building a family sedan and a sports car on the same platform and in the same factory. The Carina was a junior sedan and coupe to the larger Crown, and was similar sized to the Corona. Features included reclining seats with built-in head restraints, radio, clock, reversing lights and servo-assistance on the brakes.

In 1971, the Carina 1600GT was introduced as an alternative to the Corona-based Toyota 1600GT, using a  2T-G type 1600 DOHC engine shared with the Celica GT. The Corona GT was exclusive to Toyopet Store locations, while the Carina 1600GT was exclusive to Toyota Store locations, and the Celica GT was exclusive to Toyota Corolla Store locations. The chassis code was A10, with A15, 17 and 18 being reserved for hardtop coupés. Excepting the anomalous RA16 hardtop, A16 and 19 were used on vans (utility wagons). Beginning in 1975, A30-series numbers were used for some hardtop coupés. The wagons/vans of the first generation were not regularly exported. Carina vans entered production in December 1975.

The A10 Carina was also exported to the US, but its introduction coincided with the introduction of a 10% import duty and sales volumes were disappointing. Cars destined for export were increasingly switched towards other markets in Europe and elsewhere, and US exports stopped after only two years: instead the company progressed with plans to build car plants in the USA.

The original model usually featured a choice of a 1407 cc OHV (T) or 1588 cc OHV (2T) engine, choice of a four-speed manual gearbox, two-speed automatic gearbox or three-speed automatic gearbox and front-wheel disc brakes (drum brakes on the lowest model). It was revised in 1972 with a restyled body, new rear light cluster, filler cap repositioned in the rear quarter panel, restyled front grille and fascia. The specification was once again revised in 1974 including sealed cooling system, improved brakes, restyled wheels with flared wheel arches, and restyled interior fittings.

In late October 1975 (on sale 1 November), the Carina received a new front and rear-end styling, dual-line braking system with servo, and a repositioned handbrake and gear lever in a modified dashboard. The wheelbase and tread were increased slightly, as for the sister Celica series. Some chassis codes were accordingly changed, and the Japanese market cars received a plethora of altered engines, ranging from 1.4 to 2.0 liters.

Vehicles installed with engines with displacement at 1.5 litres or larger obligated Japanese owners to pay more annual road tax, and were considered top trim level packaged cars. Toyota introduced the "TTC-V" (Toyota Total Clean-Vortex) on the 19R engine only, using an exhaust gas recirculation implementation to comply with recently enacted emission regulations passed by the Japanese Government. The 1.4 was dropped from sedans and coupés, and a mid-range 1.8 was added at the time of the late 1975 facelift.

In December 1975 a Van version was developed, featuring the same facelifted front end. The new rear end uses the cargo door of the 30-series Corolla wagon. The Carina Van was generally not exported. The Van's TA16V/TA19V chassis codes continued to be used for the next-generation Van (which used the same rear axle and wheelbase), until the Van was facelifted again in August 1979. To bring these models in line with the second-generation Carina, they then received a new TA49 chassis code.

Second generation (A40/A50; 1977–1981) 

Released in Japan August 1977, the next-generation Carina was available in Germany in December 1977 and in other European countries during 1978. The chassis was mostly the same as that of the facelifted late Carinas of the first generation; the Van versions actually continued to use the old TA16/19 chassis codes in spite of receiving the new bodywork as they retained the old Van's underpinnings. In most markets Carinas were fitted with the same 1,588 cc 2T engine as its predecessor. In the Carina, an output of  DIN was claimed. The option of automatic transmission was new to many export markets. Japanese actor Sonny Chiba was the spokesman for the Carina in Japanese commercials for several decades.

An estate car model was introduced to export markets for the first time, with the same heavy-duty leaf-spring rear suspension that had been seen on the late appearing first generation Carina Van, as it was intended for commercial use in Japan. In 1980, all models had revised front- and rear-end styling and headlights, and also received improved interiors. The following year, saloon and coupé models (but not the estate) were fitted with five-speed gearboxes as standard, still with optional automatic transmissions.

Starting with this generation, fuel injection was available optionally on top level models. In November 1977, the 3T-U 1,800 cc engine emissions are updated. In May 1978, the GT 1600 cc was added, and a three-speed automatic transmission became available. The options list was updated to include a urethane bumper for impact improvement.

In September 1978, the 3T-EU engine (1,770 cc OHV EFI) was installed in the ST-EFI and SR-EFI models, initially only with a five-speed manual. At the same time, the 2000GT with DOHC 18R-GU and the 18R-GEU EFI engine, fit 1978 exhaust emission regulations, as did the 18R-U and 21R-U engines. The emblem was changed to "TOYOTA" from "TOYOTA CARINA". The 2000GT hardtop coupe shared a platform with the Celica, which gave Toyota the ability to sell the Celica at a different Japanese Toyota dealership called Toyota Store as the Celica was exclusive to Toyota Corolla Store locations.

In August 1979, the front of the vehicle received a major change that now included four headlamp lights rather than the previous setup, with the Van remaining with four round lamps. The rear received a changed license plate mounting to give it a new style. 3T-EU and 21R-U engines were now available with the four-speed automatic transmission. These two, along with the 18R-GEU, were now the only engines offered (in Japan). The rear suspension became of the semi-trailing type, becoming the A50 series Carina in the process. The Super Deluxe two-door sedan was discontinued, as was the 1400 Van. The 1600 Van received the 12T-J engine and the option of an automatic transmission, along with a chassis code now in line with the remainder of the Carina range (TA49V).

As of August 1980, the EFI specification 1800 Hard Top (ST-EFI, SR-EFI) was the only engine offered in the sedans/coupés.

Celica Camry (1980–1982)

Toyota utilised the A40/A50 series Carina as the basis for the Celica Camry, a four-door sports sedan launched in Japan during January 1980, and sold at Toyota Corolla Store dealerships, remaining a companion to the Carina which was exclusive to Toyota Store locations. Positioned as the sedan counterpart to the Toyota Celica (A40 and A50) two-door coupe and three-door liftback, the Celica Camry shared few components with this model. Instead, Toyota elongated the front-end of its Carina, incorporating styling cues resembling those of the 1978–1981 Celica XX (known as the Celica Supra in export markets).

Towards the end of its model lifecycle, Toyota introduced a sports version of the Celica Camry equipped with the double overhead camshaft 2.0-litre 18R-GEU engine from the Celica producing .

Although it has an identical  wheelbase to the Celica, Corona, and Carina, it is longer than the Carina but shorter than both the Corona and Celica. During its model cycle, over 100,000 units were sold in Japan. The Celica Camry was also exported to a number of markets using the Carina name, replacing the front-end styling of the second-generation Carina in these markets. These export market hybrids used a different rear-end design and were also available with station wagon bodywork. The performance image of the Celica Camry was shared with the Toyota Chaser, which was exclusive to Toyota Vista Store Japanese dealerships.

Third generation (A60; 1981–1988) 

In its third incarnation, the Carina followed the fashion of the time with a still more angular and four-square design (two-square headlights version also available). The car followed its predecessors in retaining a front-engine rear-wheel-drive configuration even though by then competitor manufacturers were following a trend of switching to front-wheel drive in this class.

The third generation was first released in September 1981. This was the last Carina to use rear-wheel drive. The RWD Corona shared its chassis with this vehicle, with the Corona being updated the succeeding year. The 1800SE had power windows, and an 1800SE "Extra Edition" trim level was added. The Carina was famously used by private teams racing for Japan in the Dakar Rally in the two-wheel-drive class for both 1981 and 1982. The Carina managed to achieve four championships in the marathon class divisions.

In February 1982, a five-door wagon series based on the Van was added, marketed as the "Carina Surf" (SA60G) in Japan. In export markets, wagons had been available since the introduction of the van model. The 1C diesel engine was also added to the lineup at this time. In May 1982, the better equipped 1500 SE trim level was added.

Celica and Corona were released with the same powerplant simultaneously. Conversely, the 18R-GEU-engined 2000GT hardtop coupe was no longer available, and was replaced by the next-generation Carina ED four-door hardtop in 1985.

In May 1983, minor changes were done to the whole range, excepting the vans. Power mirrors were added, while the front grille and the taillights were redesigned. The 1600GT sports model replaced the 2T-GEU engine with the all new 4A-GEU engine, also a 1600 cc DOHC unit but now with 16 valves. The 3T-EU engine was no longer offered.

In August 1983, a series of minor changes to the Carina Van took place. The 12T-J 1600 cc OHV engine was replaced with the lighter and more economical 1.5-liter 5K-J type.

In May 1984, the front-wheel-drive four-door sedan "Carina FF" (T150 chassis) was introduced in addition to the rear-wheel-drive sedan range. Coupé, Surf (Wagon), and vans were sold continuously. Minor changes also took place, including body-coloured bumpers for higher grade models. In August 1985, the trim levels were changed to shift the Sports models (1600GT, 1600GT-R, 1800GT-T, 1800GT-TR) into the front-wheel-drive range. Rear-wheel-drive coupé sales were terminated. The sedan lineup was now reduced to 1500 standard, DX, SG, and 1800 SG trim levels. Surf and van sales continued as heretofore. Front-engine, rear-wheel-drive Carinas continued to be produced alongside the new T150 series until May 1988 in Surf, Van, and sedan models. The Carina Van ended production in April 1987.

Fourth generation (T150; 1984–1988) 

Starting from the fourth generation, the Carina shared the Corona platform for four-door sedans. The Carina RWD platform of two-door coupés, Carina Surf, and Carina Van continued to use the Toyota "A" series platform until 1988. The Carina continued to be exclusive in Japan to Toyota Store locations, while the Corona remained exclusive to Toyopet Store locations. The Carina Coupe was cancelled once the Carina platform was realigned to the Toyota Corona "T" platform, shared with the Celica coupe and hatchback.

In May 1984, the Carina FF four-door sedan (T150 series) was introduced. The styling echoed that of the previous generation, using four headlights and grille setup. The upper trim level model has aerodynamic headlight option. Rather than replace the entire line-up all at once because sales of the previous generation were still good, Toyota gradually introduced the replacement Coupé, Van (wagon) models in stages. The 1,800 cc engine is electronically controlled distributorless ignition, and a 2,000 cc diesel is added. Other 1600 cc EFI "4A-ELU" engine, and a carburetor is used on the 1500 cc with "3A-LU" type engine. The 1800SE models were still offered.

August 1985, the Sport model 1600GT, 1600GT-R, and 2000GT-R were added to the lineup. All with twin-cam engines, they received the T160 chassis code. The 1.6s use the "4A-GELU" engine while two-litres use the "3S-GELU" engine. The sport models had altered chassis, also the wheels were upgraded from four lug nuts to five.

May 1986, had minor changes to the entire range. The design of the grille and taillights was changed. Due to the success of the 1800SE trim level, the similarly equipped but smaller-engined 1500SG Extra was added.

Carina II

For the European market, the closely related Corona (T150) was sold as the Toyota Carina II.

Carina ED (ST160 series)

The Toyota Carina ED was a Japanese compact car created in 1985 as a companion to the 1984 Carina sedan. It was positioned as the 4-door Celica coupe, ushering in a new styling and appearance direction for Toyota products. It gave Toyota Store dealerships an alternative to buyers who desired the luxury of the larger Toyota Crown hardtop, without the tax obligations of a car that exceeded Japanese Government regulations for vehicles larger than the "compact" class. Its design sought to emulate the hardtop styling of large American and European sedans, resulting in a small, low cabin with longer front and rear ends. The ED's B-pillar stood up in the middle with no purpose other than to hinge the rear door on; it was not attached to the roof side of the cabin. "ED" is the initials of "Exciting" and "Dressy".

Fifth generation (T170; 1988–1992) 

This generation was released in May 1988. The exterior sheet metal received rounded contours, as was in line with the fashionable design of products at that time. The Surf (wagon) and Van versions also underwent a full model change to bring them in line with their siblings. 4S-Fi is an 1800 cc engine type, 1600 cc of the 4A-GE and the specification for higher-power higher-cam-4A-FHE car, 1500 cc of the 5A-F type, 2000 cc diesel-2C. The 3E engine was fitted to the 1500 cc Van, which was also available with the 2000 cc diesel 2C engine.

In December 1988, a full-time 4WD system with a center differential was added to the sedan (chassis code AT175). The 1587 cc 4A-FE is the only engine available for this new AWD model.

In August 1989, the "G Limited" with the high-performance and high-compression 4A-GE engine is added; it has .

In May 1990, only minor changes. The Toyota emblem in the back is changed to a bright tail lamp lenses bulging from three places and was changed from the previous split design (The front of the van was not changed). The previous generation was a gasoline car engine and is still using the 1800 cc the 4S-FE, 1500 cc with a 5A-FE type. Surf Wagon 2,000 cc 2C has been changed to a diesel (CT170G type). It could be fitted with a driver-side airbag as an option.

Wagons and commercial vans were sold until March 10, 1992, when they were replaced with the Caldina.

European versions included a 4-door saloon, 5-door hatchback and a station wagon. They came with either the 1.6 L 4A-FE or the 2.0 L 3S-FE engine. Earlier models were very basic, and the biggest differences were interior and the presence of a tachometer. In late 1989 the top models had huge upgrades, getting electric mirrors, electric windows, central locking, heated front windscreen, and updated trim.

Carina II

For the European market, the T170-series Corona continued to be sold as the Toyota Carina II.

Carina ED (ST180 series)

The restyled second generation was introduced 1989 and luxury equipment content increased. Four-wheel steering appeared on the top level offering and styling was updated more closely resemble the Corona EXiV. Electronic fuel injection was made standard on all engines offered.

Sixth generation (T190; 1992–1996) 

The sixth-generation Carina appeared in August 1992 and was only available with a four-door sedan body style, while the five-door van/wagon models were replaced by the new Caldina. The size was also bigger than the previous model. Most of the 1.5–1.8-litre DOHC petrol engines from the previous generation were available in this generation. 2.0-litre petrol and diesel engines with 4WD system were also available.

A facelift came in August 1994. The old 1.8-litre 4S-FE engine was replaced by the newly developed 1.8-litre 7A-FE engine. This generation was discontinued in 1996.

Carina E

The Carina E was the European version of the Toyota "T" platform. It was produced in the United Kingdom at the new Burnaston plant near Derby from 16 December 1992 until 1998.

Carina ED (ST200 series)

The Carina ED 4-door hardtop ended production in 1998

Seventh generation (T210; 1996–2001) 

The seventh generation Carina was limited to a sedan version produced only for the Japanese market. The car shared few similarities with its sister model the Corona Premio which was marketed in some Asian countries. The T190 model inherited the system as the basic platform.

In 1996, along with the base model "Ti" (1500 cc-2200 cc), a sports "GT" version was introduced with the 5 valves per cylinder 4A-GE 'black top' engine and 5-speed C56 manual transmission. Beginning in 1998, the GT was equipped with a 6-speed C160 manual transmission. The station wagon/commercial van was no longer offered, having been replaced by the Toyota Caldina, and Toyota offered the Toyota Ipsum, a five-door wagon in the style of a MPV as an alternative. The Ipsum offered front-wheel drive, with optional AWD, borrowed from the Caldina. Besides, the rare 4WD model "Si" ST215, equipped with 3S-FE engine and optitron instrument panel existed. Suspension parts was shared with the Caldina ST215 4WD.

Front and door panels, seats and the instrument panel of the T210 Corona Premio was shared with the Carina. With the new Corona Premio, Toyota's first collision-safety body "GOA" was adopted. The 7A-FE engine was a lean-burn type 1.8-litre engine, the 5A-FE was 1500 cc, and the 2C-TE series was equipped with a 2000-cc turbo-diesel. The 1600-cc version of the lean-burn 4A-FE engine was no longer offered.

A "GT" sports version was based on the AT210 model. The engine was shared with the top-of-the-line AE111 Corolla Levin and Toyota Sprinter Trueno (a high-revving 4A-GE producing 165 PS and red-lining at 8000 rpm, known as the "black top"). The GT spec came with an optional manual transmission found in the AE101-AE111 Corolla Levin/Trueno of that period, which was a 5-speed manual transmission (C56-transmission series). In 1997, a Limited model equipped with few extra features was introduced, known as the "GT PIERNA". This was the only Carina GT version to be offered in black.

August 1998 brought minor changes in design. The headlamps and tail lights were given a makeover for a refreshing look and feel. Slight alterations were also made to the bumpers. The 2000 cc diesel engine of the Ti model was increased to 2200 cc.

The GT model was distinguished by the front grille where, instead of the "CARINA" emblem in the middle, the letters "GT"  were placed in red, black, and nickel. In addition, the GT was equipped with the same 6-speed short-shifter manual transmission as the Corolla Levin/Trueno C160-series which came with a limited-slip differential (LSD). The diameter of the disc brake was increased and the wheel diameter was increased to 15 inches. Tyre size for the stock GT was 195/55 R15. Along with a front strut bar, reinforcements to the rear part of the vehicle were added to bind the left and right rear sash to a support and the rear back head. These came stock and were aimed to improve overall stiffness and handling of the vehicle. The GT version came with a stylish stock front bumper body kit, side skirts and rear bumper spoilers and an optional large rear spoiler. A darker sporty fabric was used for the upholstery to match the sporty and aggressive appeal of the vehicle.

In December 2001, Carina production ended after .

European naming
In 1984 in Europe, the Corona was rebadged as the "Carina II". This continued with the new model introduced in 1988 and, subsequently, the "Carina E" introduced in 1992 which was also a Corona. The so-called "Avensis" replaced the European Carina range in 1997.

References

External links

 Toyotaoldies.de

Carina
Cars introduced in 1970
All-wheel-drive vehicles
Touring cars
1970s cars
1980s cars
1990s cars
2000s cars
Cars discontinued in 2001